The Khilafat movement (1919–24) was a political campaign launched in British India over British policy against Turkey and planned dismemberment of Turkey after World War I by allied forces.

Leaders participating in the movement included Shaukat Ali, Maulana Mohammad Ali Jauhar, Hakim Ajmal Khan, and Abul Kalam Azad some of whom were seeking to restore the caliph of the Ottoman Caliphate, while others promoted Muslim interests and to bring the Muslim in national struggle.

Mahatma Gandhi had supported the movement as part of his opposition to British Empire and he also advocated wider non-cooperation movement at the same time. Vallabhbhai Patel, Bal Gangadhar Tilak and other Congress figures also supported the movement.

The movement is generally termed described as protest against the sanctions placed on the Ottoman Empire after the First World War by the Treaty of Sèvres. It collapsed in 1924 following the abolition of the Caliphate by Turkish nationalists after the overthrow of the Ottoman sultanate.

Background

Ottoman sultan Abdul Hamid II (1842–1918) launched his pan-Islamist program in a bid to protect the Ottoman Empire from Western attack and dismemberment and to crush the democratic opposition at home. He sent an emissary, Jamaluddin Afghani, to India in the late 19th century. The cause of the Ottoman monarch evoked religious passion and sympathy amongst Indian Muslims. Being the caliph, the Ottoman sultan was nominally the supreme religious and political leader of all Sunni Muslims across the world. However, this authority was never actually used.

A large number of Muslim religious leaders began working to spread awareness and develop Muslim participation on behalf of the caliphate. Muslim religious leader Maulana Mehmud Hasan attempted to organize a national war of independence with support from the Ottoman Empire.

Abdul Hamid II was forced to restore the constitutional monarchy marking the start of the Second Constitutional Era by the Young Turk Revolution. He was succeeded by his brother Mehmed V (1844–1918) but following the revolution, the real power in the Ottoman Empire lay with the nationalists. The movement was a topic in Conference of London (February 1920); however, nationalist Arabs saw it as threat of continuation of Turkish dominance of Arab lands.

Partitioning

The Ottoman Empire, having sided with the Central Powers during World War I, suffered a major military defeat. The Treaty of Versailles (1919) reduced its territorial extent and diminished its political influence but the victorious Europe powers promised to protect the Ottoman sultan's status as the caliph. However, under the Treaty of Sèvres (1920), territories such as Palestine, Syria, Lebanon, and Iraq were severed from the empire.

Within Turkey, a progressive, secular nationalist movement arose, known as the Turkish national movement. During the Turkish War of Independence (1919–1923), the Turkish revolutionaries, led by Mustafa Kemal Atatürk, abolished the Treaty of Sèvres with the Treaty of Lausanne (1923). Pursuant to Atatürk's Reforms, the Republic of Turkey abolished the position of the caliphate in 1924. Atatürk offered the caliphate to Ahmed Sharif as-Senussi, on the condition that he reside outside Turkey; Senussi declined the offer and confirmed his support for Abdulmejid. The title was then claimed by Hussein bin Ali, Sharif of Mecca and Hejaz, leader of the Arab Revolt, but his kingdom was defeated and annexed by Ibn Saud in 1925.

Khilafat Movement in Indian Subcontinent

Although political activities and popular outcry on behalf of the caliphate emerged across the Muslim world, the most prominent activities took place in India. A prominent Oxford educated Muslim journalist, Maulana Muhammad Ali Johar had spent four years in prison for advocating resistance to the colonial government and support for the caliphate. At the onset of the Turkish War of Independence, Muslim religious leaders feared for the caliphate, which the European powers were reluctant to protect. To some of the Muslims of India, the prospect of being conscripted to fight against fellow Muslims in Turkey was anathema. To its founders and followers, the Khilafat was not a religious movement but rather a show of solidarity with their fellow Muslims in Turkey.

Mohammad Ali and his brother Maulana Shaukat Ali joined with other Muslim leaders such as Pir Ghulam Mujaddid Sarhandi, Sheikh Shaukat Ali Siddiqui, Dr. Mukhtar Ahmed Ansari, Raees-Ul-Muhajireen Barrister Jan Muhammad Junejo, Hasrat Mohani, Syed Ata Ullah Shah Bukhari, Mohammad Farooq Chishti, Maulana Abul Kalam Azad and Dr. Hakim Ajmal Khan to form the All India Khilafat Committee. The organisation was based in Lucknow, India at Hathe Shaukat Ali, the compound of Landlord Shaukat Ali Siddiqui. They aimed to build political unity amongst Muslims and use their influence to protect the caliphate. In 1920, they published the Khilafat Manifesto, which called upon the British to protect the caliphate and for Indian Muslims to unite and hold the British accountable for this purpose. The Khilafat Committee in Bengal included Mohmmad Akram Khan, Manruzzaman Islamabadi, Mujibur Rahman Khan and Chittaranjan Das.

In 1920 an alliance was made between Khilafat leaders and the Indian National Congress, the largest political party in India and of the nationalist movement. Congress leader Mahatma Gandhi and the Khilafat leaders promised to work and fight together for the causes of Khilafat and Swaraj. Seeking to increase pressure on the colonial government, the Khilafatists became a major part of the non-cooperation movement — a nationwide campaign of mass, peaceful civil disobedience. Some also engaged in a protest emigration from North-West Frontier Province to Afghanistan under Amanullah Khan. Khilafat leaders such as Dr. Ansari, Maulana Azad and Hakim Ajmal Khan also grew personally close to Gandhi. These leaders founded the Jamia Millia Islamia in 1920 to promote independent education and social rejuvenation for Muslims.

The non-cooperation campaign was at first successful. The programme started with boycott of legislative councils, government schools, colleges and foreign goods. Government functions and surrender of titles and distinctions. Massive protests, strikes and acts of civil disobedience spread across India. Hindus and Muslims joined forces in the campaign, which was initially peaceful. Gandhi, the Ali brothers and others were swiftly arrested by the colonial government. Under the flag of Tehrik-e-Khilafat, a Punjab Khilafat deputation comprising Moulana Manzoor Ahmed and Moulana Lutfullah Khan Dankauri took a leading role throughout India, with a particular concentration in the Punjab (Sirsa, Lahore, Haryana etc.). People from villages such as Aujla Khurd were the main contributors to the cause.

Collapse
Although holding talks with the colonial government and continuing their activities, the Khilafat movement weakened as Muslims were divided between working for the Congress, the Khilafat cause and the Muslim League.

The final blow came with the victory of Mustafa Kemal Pasha's forces, who overthrew the Ottoman rule to establish a progressive, secular republic in independent Turkey. He abolished the role of caliph and sought no help from Indians.

The Khilafat leadership fragmented on different political lines. Syed Ata Ullah Shah Bukhari created Majlis-e-Ahrar-e-Islam with the support of Chaudhry Afzal Haq. Leaders such as Dr. Ansari, Maulana Azad and Hakim Ajmal Khan remained strong supporters of Gandhi and the Congress. The Ali brothers joined Muslim League. They would play a major role in the growth of the League's popular appeal and the subsequent Pakistan movement. There was, however, a caliphate conference in Jerusalem in 1931 following Turkey's abolition of the Khilafat, to determine what should be done about the caliphate.

Legacy
By critics, the movement is regarded as one of the political agitation based on a pan-Islamist, fundamentalist platform and being largely indifferent to the cause of Indian independence. Critics of the Khilafat see its alliance with the Congress as a marriage of convenience. Proponents of the Khilafat see it as the spark that led to the non-cooperation movement in India and a major milestone in improving Hindu-Muslim relations, while advocates of Pakistan and Muslim separatism see it as a major step towards establishing the separate Muslim state. The Ali brothers are regarded as one of the founding-fathers of Pakistan, while Azad, Dr. Ansari and Hakim Ajmal Khan are widely celebrated as national heroes in India.

See also
Nawab Mohammad Ismail Khan
Moplah Riots
Pakistan Movement
Progressive Writers' Movement
Majlis-e-Ahrar-ul-Islam
Maulana Shaukat Ali
Nehru Report
Chauri Chaura incident
All-India Muslim League

References

Bibliography

Further reading
 
 
 
 Gandhi, Khilafat & The National Movement by N.S. Rajan, Publisher :Sahitya Sindhu Prakashan

External links

Indian independence movement
Islam in India
Pakistan Movement
Organizations established in 1919
1919 establishments in India
Organizations disestablished in 1924
1924 disestablishments in India
Pan-Islamism
Foreign relations of the Ottoman Empire